Larsen's Opening (also called the Nimzo–Larsen Attack or Queen's Fianchetto Opening) is a chess opening starting with the move:
1. b3
It is named after the Danish grandmaster Bent Larsen.  Larsen was inspired by the example of the great Latvian-Danish player and theoretician Aron Nimzowitsch (1886–1935), who often played 1.Nf3 followed by 2.b3, which is sometimes called the Nimzowitsch–Larsen Attack. It is classified under the A01 code in the Encyclopaedia of Chess Openings.

The flank opening move 1.b3 prepares to fianchetto the  where it will help control the central squares in hypermodern fashion and put useful pressure on Black's . The b2-bishop is often a source of recurring irritation for Black, who should not treat it lightly.

Although Larsen was initially very successful with this opening, it suffered a setback in the 1970 USSR vs. Rest of the World match in Belgrade, where Larsen played it against reigning world champion Boris Spassky and lost in 17 moves.  Larsen was also decisively defeated when playing it against Rosendo Balinas, Jr. at Manila in 1975.

Notably, this opening received interest from Bobby Fischer the same year, who employed 1.b3 on at least five occasions, winning all five, including games with GM Miroslav Filip, GM Henrique Mecking (Palma de Mallorca 1970 Interzonal), GM Vladimir Tukmakov (Buenos Aires 1970), and GM Ulf Andersson (Siegen 1970). Today, Larsen's Opening is occasionally used at the GM-level, with top grandmasters Hikaru Nakamura, Richárd Rapport, and Baadur Jobava employing it successfully.

Popularity
The move 1.b3 is less popular than 1.g3 (Benko's Opening), which prepares a quick  castling. According to ChessBase, 1.b3 ranks sixth in popularity out of the possible 20 first moves while the fifth-ranking 1.g3 is about three times as popular. Larsen frequently used unconventional openings of this sort. He believed it to be an advantage in that Black, usually unfamiliar with such openings, is forced to rely on his own abilities instead of relying on memorised, well-analysed moves of more common White openings.

Main lines
Black has several options to meet 1.b3. The most common are:
1...e5, the Modern Variation, is the most common response, making a grab for the centre and limiting the scope of the white bishop. Play typically continues 2.Bb2 Nc6. Then the Main line is 3.e3 d5 4.Bb5 Bd6 5.c4. After 2.Bb2 Nc6, 3.f4 is the Paschmann Gambit. After 2.Bb2, 2...f5 3.e4 is called the Ringelbach Gambit.
1...d5, the Classical Variation, is the second most common, also making a grab for the centre and preserving the option to fianchetto the king's bishop to oppose the white one. White can play 2.Nf3 to transpose to the A06 line (see more below), or 2.Bb2 to proceed in the A01 line.
1...Nf6, the Indian Variation, developing a piece and not committing to a particular pawn formation just yet. 2.Bb2 and if 2...g6 then 3.e4, taking advantage of the pinned knight (e.g., not 3...Nxe4 4.Bxh8, winning a rook at the price of a pawn). 3.g4 is called the Spike Variation.
1...c5, the English Variation, retaining the options of ...d5, or ...d6 followed by ...e5. 2.c4 transposing to an English Opening or 2.e4 transposing to a Sicilian Defence.
1...f5, the Dutch Variation. 
Less common lines include:
1...e6, with Black setting up a variation on the French Defence. Here Keene recommends 2.e4 and if 2...d5 then 3.Bb2.
1...c6, a Caro–Kann variant preparing for ...d5. Again Keene recommends 2.e4 and if 2...d5, 3.Bb2.
1...b6, the Symmetrical Variation, is completely fine for Black.
1...b5, the Polish Variation.
1...Nc6, a variant of the Nimzowitsch Defence, with this move, Black aims to provide support for the advance of e-pawn. The most common sequence that Black applies is 2...e5 or less commonly 2...d5.

1.Nf3 Nf6 2.b3

1.Nf3 Nf6 2.b3 is a similar opening. Nimzowitsch preferred to make the knight move first. Black may play 2...d5 or 2...g6. After 2...d5, White usually plays 3.Bb2, then Black usually plays 3...e6.

After 2...g6, White can play 3.g3, 3.Bb2, or 3.c4. The move 3.g3 is the same as 2.g3 g6 3.b3, which gives Reti Opening (ECO A05) or King's Indian, Fianchetto without c4 (ECO A49). With move 3.Bb2, Black usually plays 3...Bg7. White can continue 4.g3, 4.c4, or 4.e3. After 3.c4, play usually continues 3...Bg7 4.Bb2.

Nimzowitsch–Larsen Attack

The opening 1.Nf3 d5 2.b3 (ECO A06) is called the Nimzowitsch–Larsen Attack. It can be derived from 1.b3, but 1.Nf3 is more usual. Common replies for Black are 2...c5, 2...Nf6, and 2...Bg4. For each, White can play 3.Bb2 or 3.e3. 3.Bb2 can be followed by 4.e3.

Example games
Larsen vs. Eley, 1972 1.b3 e5 2.Bb2 Nc6 3.e3 Nf6 4.Bb5 d6 5.Ne2 Bd7 6.0-0 Be7 7.f4 e4 8.Ng3 0-0 9.Bxc6 bxc6 10.c4 d5 11.Nc3 Re8 12.Rc1 Bg4 13.Nce2 Nd7 14.h3 Bxe2 15.Qxe2 Nc5 16.Qg4 g6 17.f5 Nd3 18.fxg6 hxg6 19.Rf7 Kf7 20.Rf1 Bf6 21.Bxf6 
Keene vs. Kovacevic, 1973 1.Nf3 d5 2.b3 Bg4 3.Bb2 Nd7 4.g3 Bxf3 5.exf3 Ngf6 6.f4 e6 7.Bg2 Be7 8.0-0 0-0 9.d3 a5 10.a4 c6 11.Nd2 b5 12.Qe2 bxa4 13.Rxa4 Nb6 14.Ra2 a4 15.Rfa1 axb3 16.Rxa8 Nxa8 17.Nxb3 Nb6 18.f5 exf5 19.Nd4 Qd7 20.Bh3 g6 21.Bxf5 gxf5 22.Ra7 Qxa7 23.Nxc6 Qd7 24.Nxe7 Kg7 25.Qh5 1–0
 Baadur Jobava vs. Yu Yangyi, Tata Steel Challengers 2014 1. b3 d5 2. Bb2 Bf5 3. e3 e6 4. h3 h6 5. Nc3 Bh7 6. d4 Nf6 7. Bd3 Bxd3 8. Qxd3 Nbd7 9. O-O-O Bb4 10. Nge2 O-O 11. g4 c5 12. dxc5 Qe7 13. Rhg1 Nxc5 14. Qd4 Nce4 15. Nxe4 dxe4 16. g5 hxg5 17. Qe5 Rfd8 18. Rxd8+ Rxd8 19. Qxg5 Ne8 20. Qe5 f5 21. Nf4 Ba3 22. Rg6 Bxb2+ 23. Kxb2 Rd6 24. Rxe6 Rxe6 25. Qxe6+ Qf7 26. h4 Qxe6 27. Nxe6 Nf6 28. Kc3 Ng4 29. Nd8 b6 30. Nc6 Nxf2 31. Kd4 Kf7 32. Nxa7 Ke6 33. Nc8 Ng4 34. Nxb6 Ne5 35. h5 1-0

See also
 List of chess openings
 List of chess openings named after people

References

Bibliography

Further reading

External links

ECO A01: Nimzovich–Larsen Attack

Chess openings